The 2004 Players Championship (officially the 2004 Daily Record Players Championship) was a professional ranking snooker tournament that took place between 3–11 April 2004 at the S.E.C.C in Glasgow, Scotland. It was the seventh and penultimate ranking event of the 2003/2004 season.

The tournament was a re-branding of the Scottish Open which had been held under various names since 1981. It was the last time the tournament was played until it returned to the calendar in 2016, under the original name from previous seasons.

Twelve years after his last ranking tournament success, Jimmy White aged 41 won his tenth ranking tournament by defeating Paul Hunter 9–7 in the final. This was White's first success in the tournament, having last appeared in the final in 1988 International Open, when he lost 12–6 to Steve Davis. It was also Hunter's last appearance in a ranking final.

Prize fund
The breakdown of prize money for this year is shown below:

Winner: £82,500
Final: £42,500
Semi-final: £21,500
Quarter-final: £11,800
Last 16: £9,700
Last 32: £7,600
Last 48: £4,200
Last 64: £3,100

Last 80: £2,200
Last 96: £1,500
Stage one highest break: £1,800
Stage two highest break: £5,000
Stage one maximum break: £5,000
Stage two maximum break: £20,000
Total: £597,200

Main draw

Final

Qualifying
Qualifying for the tournament took place at Pontin's in Prestatyn, Wales between 11 and 15 March 2004.

Round 1 
Best of 9 frames

Round 2–4

Century breaks

Qualifying stage centuries

 144, 102  Stuart Bingham
 144  Garry Hardiman
 137, 135, 100  Ding Junhui
 134  Chris Melling
 132, 115, 109  Adrian Gunnell
 126  Lee Walker
 125  Mark King
 125  Neil Robertson
 124  Tom Ford
 123  Patrick Wallace
 121  Martin Dziewialtowski
 120, 106  Ryan Day

 118  Shaun Murphy
 113  Ali Carter
 112, 104, 103  Kurt Maflin
 108  Jamie Burnett
 107  Munraj Pal
 106  Barry Pinches
 106  Adrian Rosa
 104  Ian Preece
 102  Simon Bedford
 102  Mark Davis
 101  Michael Holt

Televised stage centuries

 145  Ken Doherty
 144, 135, 121, 117, 110  Paul Hunter
 144  Peter Ebdon
 138  Mark King
 123  John Higgins
 122  David Gray
 121, 115, 104  Jimmy White
 120  Ryan Day
 112, 106  Graeme Dott

 107, 106, 103  Ronnie O'Sullivan
 106  Stephen Lee
 105, 102  Rod Lawler
 103, 101  Ian McCulloch
 103  Stephen Hendry
 102  Alan McManus
 102  Stuart Bingham
 100  Joe Perry

References

2004
Players Championship
Players Championship, 2004
International sports competitions in Glasgow